Hidra is a former municipality that was located in the old Vest-Agder county in Norway. The  municipality existed from 1893 until its dissolution in 1965.  It encompassed the islands and southern coastal part of the present-day municipality of Flekkefjord in what is now Agder county. The municipality included the islands of Hidra and Andabeløya as well as 56 other islands, plus the mainland coast from Abelsnes to the river Sira. The administrative centre was the village of Kirkehavn where Hidra Church is located.

Hidra was home to Olav Omland (1909–1998), a landscape and coastal painter. He was also a poet and songwriter, and composed the song about Hidra "Hidrasangen".  Hidra was also home to the eccentric personality and artist Tatjana Lars Kristian Guldbrandsen.

Name
The name is probably derived from a word with the meaning "split" or "cleft" (referring to the fact that the island is almost split in two by the Rasvåg fjord). Prior to 1918, the name was spelled Hitterø.

History
The parish of Nes og Hitterø was established as a municipality on 1 January 1838 (see formannskapsdistrikt law). However, on 8 October 1893, this municipality was split into two municipalities: Hitterø (population: 2,075) and Nes (population: 1,704). During the 1960s, there were many municipal mergers across Norway due to the work of the Schei Committee. On 1 January 1965, Hidra municipality (formerly called Hitterø) was merged with the municipalities of Nes, Gyland, most of Bakke, and the town of Flekkefjord to form the new municipality of Flekkefjord. Prior to the merger, Hidra had a population of 1,277.

Government
All municipalities in Norway, including Hidra, are responsible for primary education (through 10th grade), outpatient health services, senior citizen services, unemployment and other social services, zoning, economic development, and municipal roads.  The municipality was governed by a municipal council of elected representatives, which in turn elected a mayor.

Municipal council
The municipal council  of Hidra was made up of representatives that were elected to four year terms.  The party breakdown of the final municipal council was as follows:

See also
List of former municipalities of Norway

References

Flekkefjord
Former municipalities of Norway
1893 establishments in Norway
1965 disestablishments in Norway